The 1874 Eye by-election was fought on 17 March 1874.  The byelection was fought due to the incumbent Conservative MP, George Barrington, becoming Vice-Chamberlain of the Household.  It was retained by the incumbent.

References

1874 elections in the United Kingdom
1874 in England
Eye
Ministerial by-elections to the Parliament of the United Kingdom
Eye, Suffolk
March 1874 events